Maya Macchindra, also titled alternatively as Alakh Niranjan, is the title of various number of films produced in different languages in India. The story is based on the life of Matsyendranath or Machindranath one of the eighty-four Mahasiddhas, tantric yogic master and the founder of nath lineage, and his famous disciple, baba Gorakhnath.

1932 Marathi/Hindi film

Maya Machhindra is a 1932 Marathi and Hindi black-and-white film, produced by Prabhat Films, directed by Shantaram Rajaram Vankudre. The film is based on Mani Shankar Trivedi's play Siddhasansar  with music scored by Govindrao Tembe.

Cast
Govindrao Tembe—Machhindranath
Durga Khote—Queen
Master Vinayak—Gorakh
Baburao Pendharkar

Production
Maya Machhindra was a popular legend in ancient India and Tibet about tantric masters, and was made into a movie in more than one language six times. It was first made in Marathi and Hindi in 1932, soon after India’s first sound film Alam Ara was made in 1931. The film was produced and directed by Vankudre (for V.) Shantaram. Govinda Rao Tembe, played Machindranath. His disciple Gorakhnath was played by Vinayak, and the queen was played by Durga Khote.

1939 Tamil film 

Maya Machindra is a Tamil language film, scripted by Lakshmana Das. The title role was essayed by M.K. Radha. The film was released in 1939 and had a successful run.
According to MGR's autobiography 'Naan Yaen Piranthaen', M.G. Nadaraja Pillai was originally booked for the villain character role (Sooriya Kethu) in the movie, and MGR was given the minor role of Visaladcha Maharaja, a brother of Sooriya Kethu. This minor character would get killed in the first and only scene, he appears. But, one week before the scheduled shooting day in Calcutta, M.G. Nadaraja Pillai had died. As a result, MGR was given the Sooriya Kethu role, assigned to the deceased actor. MGR had praised M.G. Nadaraja Pillai, as the one who gave him 'good career enhancing break' by his death.

Cast

1945 Telugu film

Maya Machhindra is a 1945 Telugu language film directed by P. Pullaiah.

Cast
 Jandhyala Gaurinatha Sastry
 Addanki Srirama Murthy
 Kannamba
 K. Malathi
 Satyajeet
 Krishna Murthy

1975 Telugu Film

Maya Maschindra is a 1975 Telugu language film produced by Pinjala Subba Rao and directed by Babu Bhai Mistry. It was also dubbed into Hindi.

Cast
 N. T. Rama Rao as Lord Vishnu / Maya Machhindra 
 Vanisri as Goddess Lakshmi / Tilottama Devi
 Ramakrishna as Lord Siva / Ghoraknath

Hindi movies
It was made into Bollywood film in 1950 as Alakh Niranjan, and Maya machhindra in 1951, starring Trilok Kapoor and Nirupa Roy, in 1960 starring Manher Desai, Nirupa Roy. and in 1975 by Srinath Tripathi starring Abhi Bhattacharya.

1981 Gujrati movie
Allakh Niranjan is a 1981 Indian Gujarati film, directed by Jayant.K.Bhatt. The film stars Rita Bhaduri, Jayshree Gadkar, Jayshree T., Ramesh Mehta, Shrikant Jani, Manhar Desai in lead roles.

References

1939 films
1930s Tamil-language films
1940s Telugu-language films
Articles containing video clips
Films directed by P. Pullayya
Indian black-and-white films
1930s Marathi-language films
1970s Telugu-language films
1930s Hindi-language films